Matías Cavalleri Lopetegui (born 8 April 1998) is a Chilean professional footballer who plays as a forward for Unión La Calera.

Club career
Cavalleri had a period with the Universidad Católica academy, prior to joining the ranks of Newell's Old Boys. In 2018, Chilean Primera División side Curicó Unido signed Cavalleri. He made his professional debut on 11 February, starting a home league defeat to ex-club Universidad Católica though was later substituted off at the interval. Cavalleri netted his first goals in May 2019 against Audax Italiano and Palestino.

International career
Cavalleri has previously represented Chile at U17 and U20 level and Chile U23 at the 2020 Pre-Olympic Tournament.

He was called up to a some senior team training microcycles in April 2019 and 2020.

Career statistics
.

Personal life
He is the nephew of Fernando "Palito" Cavalleri, a former Argentine naturalized Chilean football player and manager who had a long career in Chile, among other countries, and who died on 2017.

References

External links

1998 births
Living people
Chilean people of Argentine descent
Sportspeople of Argentine descent
Chilean people of Italian descent
Place of birth missing (living people)
Chilean footballers
Chile youth international footballers
Chile under-20 international footballers
Association football forwards
Chilean expatriate footballers
Expatriate footballers in Argentina
Chilean expatriate sportspeople in Argentina
Chilean Primera División players
Curicó Unido footballers
Unión La Calera footballers
People from Santiago Province, Chile